Founded in 1991, First Bank and Trust is a New Orleans-based independent bank with branch locations across the Gulf Coast.

The main office is located in Downtown New Orleans inside the First Bank and Trust Tower

First Bank and Trust has branches located in Louisiana in New Orleans, Metairie, Algiers, Kenner, Harahan, Covington, Harvey, Baton Rouge, Amite, Greensburg, Hammond, and Lafayette. Additionally, First Bank and Trust serves Mississippi with branches in Biloxi and Gulftport. Home mortgage offices (FBT Mortgage, LLC), covering southeast Louisiana, are also located in branch offices.

First Bank and Trust's parent company, First Trust Corporation, also holds affiliated subsidiaries FBT Investments, FBT Advisors and First Insurance Agency.

First Bank and Trust is state chartered and Federal Deposit Insurance Corporation-insured with approximately $1 billion in assets as of March 30, 2020.

Company logo
The company's logo is based on the Delta symbol that represented "change" and "strength" during ancient times. In New Orleans, the shape symbolizes the Mississippi River delta region that the bank serves.

References

External links
First Bank and Trust official site
Louisiana Bankers Association
FBT Film & Entertainment
A Child's Wish
FBT Investments

Banks based in Louisiana
Banks established in 1991
1991 establishments in Louisiana